The D/DA class are a class of diesel locomotives built by Clyde Engineering, Granville for the Western Australian Government Railways in 1971-1972.

History
Five D class were ordered by the Western Australian Government Railways to haul bauxite services. These were followed by seven DA class locomotives. These differed in not having dynamic brakes and were 12 tonnes lighter.

In August 1998, D1564-65 were sold to Tranz Rail and rebuilt with new cabs at Hutt Workshops before being sent to TasRail in June 2001 entering service as 2020-21. The new cabs resembled the cab that was fitted to DXR8007 at the time. In September 1998, D1563 was exported to Chile, where it would be overhauled and operated by the Ferrocarril de Antofagasta a Bolivia.

The remaining nine locomotives were included in the sale of Westrail to Australian Railroad Group in October 2000. When this was split in June 2006, DA 1577 was transferred to Genesee & Wyoming Australia with the South Australian business with the other eight passed to QR National with the Western Australian operations. D1562 and DAZ1902-06 were exported to South Africa in January 2015 and are now owned by APEX Industrial.

TasRail D class

The two D class locomotives purchased by Tranz Rail in 1998 were rebuilt at Hutt Workshops, as a cheaper alternative to buying new locomotives. Tranz Rail rebuilt the two locomotives before transferring them to ATN Tasrail of which they were a shareholder. 

The locomotives were rebuilt with a new design of universal cab with a shorter low hood and more angular appearance (the same cab style used on Tranz Rail's DXR 8007 first cab rebuild). The two locos were repainted into the Wisconsin Central Maroon livery, and were renumbered in the 202X series from the 156X series as they were in Western Australia.

The two locomotives arrived at Bell Bay on 15 June 2001. Because they lacked traction motors when the locos were rebuilt, surplus English Electric EE548 traction motors were fitted to the locos at East Tamar Workshops. The two locos entered service a few months after arrival. Following a large number of traction motor failures, the traction motors were replaced by second hand GM motors in 2009.

Withdrawals and disposal
With the introduction of the TR class, both were withdrawn in mid-2014. Both were stored at East Tamar Workshops and sold to Watco Australia in 2017 for use on infrastructure trains. D 2020 was shipped from Burnie on 5 May 2017 on Toll ship called the Victorian Reliance, while 2021 was shipped on 13 May on Toll ship named the Tasmanian Achiever. Both locomotives were rebuilt at Bendigo Workshops, Victoria, and shipped to Perth in January 2018.

Class list (D)

Class list (DA)

See also

Westrail DB class

References

External links

History of Western Australian Railways & Stations gallery

Aurizon diesel locomotives
Clyde Engineering locomotives
Co-Co locomotives
Diesel locomotives of Western Australia
Railway locomotives introduced in 1971
3 ft 6 in gauge locomotives of Australia
Diesel-electric locomotives of Australia